The Kent and Sussex Crematorium and Cemetery is a crematorium and cemetery located in Royal Tunbridge Wells in the county of Kent, England.

Background
As a quickly developing and popular Victorian era spa town, the town of Tunbridge Wells did not gain its first church until 1829, when the Decimus Burton designed Holy Trinity Church opened.

However, as the town's expansion quickened, and with no additional land into which to expand the grounds, Woodbury Park proved too small. Although burials were continued to be allowed in family plots post 1873, the last burial took place there in 1934. It is now Grade II listed.

History
After Tunbridge Wells town corporation had procured lands on the northern edge of Frant forest/southern edge of the town, the initially named Frant Forest Cemetery opened in 1873. It was laid out over an initial  site by the town surveyor William Brentnall, who had originally been recruited to rebuild the drainage system around the town. Bretnall was later buried in the same grounds. The co-located crematorium was opened in 1959.

In June 2014, a new Friends of Tunbridge Wells Cemetery association were formed.

The cemetery contains the war graves of 72 Commonwealth service personnel of World War I and 63 of World War II.

Notable burials
John Duncan Grant, British Army officer who was awarded the Victoria Cross (ashes) 
William Hartnell, actor, the first Doctor Who (ashes) 
Nikolai Legat, premier danseur, teacher, choreographer and caricaturist.
Nadine Nicolaeva-Legat, prima ballerina, teacher and choreographer.
Mantovani, musician and conductor

References

External links
Official website
Friends of Tunbridge Wells Cemetery

1873 establishments in England
Cemeteries in Kent
Buildings and structures in Royal Tunbridge Wells
Crematoria in England
Commonwealth War Graves Commission cemeteries in England